Greta Almroth (15 April 1888 – 24 July 1981) was a Swedish silent film actress. She appeared in 31 films between 1912 and 1940.

Almroth studied at  theatre school and made her stage debut in 1908. She was one of the first major stars of Swedish cinema, appearing in more than 30 films. She was a member of the women's association Nya Idun.

She is buried at Norra begravningsplatsen in Stockholm.

Selected filmography

 A Ruined Life (1912)
 The Voice of Passion (1913)
 Judge Not (1914)
 Daughter of the Peaks (1914)
 Hearts That Meet (1914)
 Guilt Redeemed (1915)
 The Sea Vultures (1916)
 The Lass from the Stormy Croft (1917)
 His Lordship's Last Will (1919)
 The Parson's Widow (1920)
 A Lover in Pawn (1920)
 The People of Simlang Valley (1924)
 Melody of the Sea (1934)
 John Ericsson, Victor of Hampton Roads (1937)
 Good Friends and Faithful Neighbours (1938)
 Västkustens hjältar (1940)

References

External links

1888 births
1981 deaths
Actresses from Stockholm
Swedish film actresses
Swedish silent film actresses
20th-century Swedish actresses
Members of Nya Idun
Burials at Norra begravningsplatsen